Ask Me Anything is a 2014 American drama film written and directed by Allison Burnett, based on his fictional novel Undiscovered Gyrl. The film stars Britt Robertson, Justin Long, Martin Sheen, Christian Slater, Robert Patrick, and Max Carver.

Ask Me Anything had its world premiere at the Nashville Film Festival, before it was released on December 19, 2014, by Phase 4 Films theatrically and via video on demand and other online platforms. The film was released on DVD March 3, 2015.

Plot
Katie Kampenfelt, a beautiful, funny, free-spirited, lost soul decides to take a year off before attending college. Her guidance counselor suggests she chronicle her feelings and experiences in a diary or blog.

Katie keeps her anonymous blog regularly updated, mostly with sexual adventures. Initially it's primarily with a 30+ y.o. film guy with a girlfriend, Dan, and with her teenaged boyfriend, Rory. She gets a well-paid job in a book shop with Glen, but her mother makes her quit when they discover that he is a registered sex offender. 

Dan moves without saying goodbye or arranging for them to stay in contact. Her one girl friend, Jade, calls her up, and they go dancing. Katie gets a new job as a nanny for Paul from Tufts' newborn. It pays well and includes a car. 

Five weeks after Dan moved, Katie gets ahold of him. After they have full on intercourse, he reveals he's engaged to Martine. Upset upon returning home, Rory confronts Katie, demanding answers. When she tells him she's in love with the older Dan, his rage provokes her mom's partner Mark to throw him out.

On New Year's eve, when Katie is told her mom is engaged she calls Rory only to find out he's now with Jade. She finally calls to meet up with Joel, a guy who tutored her in high school. He is also taking a sabatical, but for his mental health. 

When Katie shows Joel a note which Paul gave her, which he thinks is an obvious come on. From stories she tells him, he says it's obvious she's been molested so he convinces her to see a shrink.

Within a short time, Katie has sex for the last time with Dan, the first time with 43 y.o. Paul, Joel leaves her an angry voicemail and Rory calls her a whore when she tells him she's pregnant. Her narrative begins to turn dark, particularly after the pregnancy.

Katie tells Glenn, her former boss, some of her dark secrets. He offers her a place to live and, if she chooses to keep it, to raise her baby as his own. When she gets home, she adds this to her blog, saying that moving out will be the beginning of her adult life, and the right time to stop blogging.

We learn that Katie's real name is Amy Grantham, and that just minutes after that last blog post, she received a short phone call from a blocked number. She left the house in her car a few minutes later, and was never seen again. 

We briefly see the real versions of the people that "Katie" had blogged about, many confirming that somebut not allof her sexual escapades had truly happened. It is also revealed that other details had been fictionally improved in her blog, such as her best friend really being a homeless drug addict rather than the well off "Jade" that "Katie" had blogged about, or that the baby's father, while still an older man, worked in a video store rather than being a film school professor. 

The film ends with Amy’s mother, Carol Grantham, writing the truth on Amy’s blog and imploring the thousands of readers for any knowledge as to where Amy might be.

Cast

Reception
Gary Goldstein, of the Los Angeles Times, felt that it "begins with a snarky, bubble-gum vibe that gives way to something far deeper and more meaningful” that "all beautifully paid off in the movie's haunting coda." Mike Reyes of CinemaBlend felt that it failed "to even surpass TV-movie standards", and that it failed "to earn that twist and the fall out, which leaves this ending flapping in the wind".

Ask Me Anything premiered at the Nashville Film Festival where it received a Best Actress award for Britt Robertson as well as the award for Best Music in a Feature Film.

In December 2015, Ask Me Anything ranked number one on Taste of Cinema's 30 Underappreciated 21st Century American Movies Worth Your Time.

Home media
The film was released to video on demand as well as other online platforms on December 19, 2014. The DVD was released March 3, 2015.

Soundtrack
Director Allison Burnett held a contest asking for undiscovered female singers, age 21 and under, to submit songs for the soundtrack. Approximately one hundred songs were submitted, with fourteen showing up on the official soundtrack released to iTunes and other online distributors.

Sequel

A direct sequel, titled Another Girl, was released in 2021. The film focuses on a woman who read Katie’s book and reaches out to her wanting to know what happened, only to find out that there is an even bigger mystery around Katie’s disappearance. The film is also directed by the same director.

References

External links
 

Films based on American novels
2010s English-language films